Ndebele may refer to:
Southern Ndebele people, located in South Africa
Northern Ndebele people, located in South Africa

Languages 
Southern Ndebele language, the language of the South Ndebele
Northern Ndebele language, the language of the Northern Ndebele

See also
Matabele (disambiguation)

Language and nationality disambiguation pages